This is a list of the National Register of Historic Places in Presidio County, Texas

This is intended to be a complete list of properties and districts listed on the National Register of Historic Places in Presidio County, Texas. There are six districts and seven individual properties listed on the National Register in the county. One site is also a Texas State Historic Site while four others are Recorded Texas Historic Landmarks including one State Antiquities Landmark.

Current listings

The publicly disclosed locations of National Register properties and districts may be seen in a mapping service provided.

|}

See also

National Register of Historic Places listings in Texas
List of Texas State Historic Sites
Recorded Texas Historic Landmarks in Presidio County

References

External links

Registered Historic Places
Presidio County
Buildings and structures in Presidio County, Texas